Austin C. Chewe is a Zambian businessman and politician. He served as Member of the National Assembly for Kabwe from 1996 until 2001.

Biography
Chewe served in the Zambian Army, reaching the rank of captain and managing The Sentries, an army-based band. After leaving the army, he became a businessman. He ran as an independent candidate in the 1996 general elections and was elected to the National Assembly in Kabwe, defeating incumbent MP Paul Tembo. He later joined the Forum for Democracy and Development and ran unsuccessfully for the position of chairman in 2001.

Chewe did not stand for re-election in the 2001 general elections and subsequently joined the Movement for Multi-Party Democracy (MMD). He was expelled from the party in 2005, but readmitted in 2006. Later in the year he was the MMD candidate in Munali in the 2006 general elections. However, he was beaten by Chilufya Mumbi of the Patriotic Front. Chewe later switched his support to the Patrtiotic Front, campaigning for Edgar Lungu in the 2015 presidential elections.

References

Living people
Zambian military personnel
20th-century Zambian businesspeople
Movement for Multi-Party Democracy politicians
Forum for Democracy and Development politicians
Members of the National Assembly of Zambia
Year of birth missing (living people)